The Costache Negruzzi National College (Colegiul Național „Costache Negruzzi”) in Iași is one of the most prestigious high schools in Romania. Founded in 1895 as the Boarding High School of Iași, it was named after the writer and politician Costache Negruzzi.

History

The Boarding High School of Iași opened its gates on 5 October 1895, following an English boarding school model, focused on a wide range of children (of different social and cultural statuses and religions) from the Romanian Old Kingdom and Transylvania.

Notable staff and alumni

References

External links

  Official site
 A history of 125 years: "C. Negruzzi" Boarding School 
 Jassy – The Boarding High School postcard

Educational institutions established in 1895
Negruzzi
National Colleges in Romania
Historic monuments in Iași County
1895 establishments in Romania